libguestfs is a C library and a set of tools for accessing and modifying virtual disk images used in platform virtualization. The tools can be used for viewing and editing virtual machines (VMs) managed by libvirt and files inside VMs, scripting changes to VMs, creating VMs, and much else besides.
It was created because of security issues, when virtual disk images are mounted directly on the host system. 

libguestfs can access nearly any type of file system including: all known types of Linux filesystem (ext2/3/4, XFS, btrfs, etc.), any Windows filesystem (VFAT and NTFS), any Mac OS X and BSD filesystems, LVM2 volume management, MBR and GPT disk partitions, raw disks, qcow2, VirtualBox VDI, VMWare VMDK, Hyper-V VHD/VHDX, on files, local devices, CD and DVD ISOs, SD cards, or remotely over FTP, HTTP, SSH, iSCSI, NBD, GlusterFS, Ceph, Sheepdog, and much more. libguestfs does not require root permissions.

The functionality is available through a shell called . There is a rescue shell called  for fixing unbootable virtual machines.

libguestfs is also an API that can be linked with C and C++ management programs and has bindings for Perl, Python, Ruby, Java, OCaml, PHP, Haskell, Erlang, Lua, Golang and C#. It can be used from shell scripts or in the command line. Using the FUSE module guest filesystems can be mounted on the host with the  command.

libguestfs is implemented using the Kernel-based Virtual Machine for the Linux kernel.

See also 

 Kernel-based Virtual Machine (KVM)
 QEMU
 libvirt
 OpenStack
 Linux range of use#Virtualization

References

External links 
 

Application programming interfaces
Free virtualization software
Virtual machines
Virtualization software for Linux